Coen Maertzdorf (born 24 August 1993) is a Dutch professional footballer who currently plays for De Treffers in the Dutch Tweede Divisie. He formerly played for De Graafschap.

Career
He made his debut for De Graafschap on 10 August in the home match versus Excelsior. He replaced Soufian El Hassnaoui in the second half.

References

External links
 

1993 births
Living people
Dutch footballers
De Graafschap players
De Treffers players
Eerste Divisie players
Tweede Divisie players
Derde Divisie players
People from Zevenaar
Association football forwards
Footballers from Gelderland
21st-century Dutch people